Hoodrush is a 2012 Nigerian musical thriller film written, produced, and directed by Dimeji Ajibola, and starring OC Ukeje, Bimbo Akintola, and Gabriel Afolayan. It received two nominations at the 9th Africa Movie Academy Awards, Gabriel Afolayan eventually won the award for the category Best Actor In A Supporting Role.

The film tells a story of the challenges encountered by two brothers who strive to partake in musical talent shows.

Cast
OC Ukeje as Shez Jabari
Bimbo Akintola as Alhaja Khadijah
Gabriel Afolayan as Tavier Jabari
Chelsea Eze as Shakira
Ijeoma Agu as Kelechi

Reception

Critical reception
The film received mostly positive to average reviews. Nollywood Reinvented praised the film for its beautiful and well composed music and gave it a 69% rating, stating "the speedometer of the movie at the beginning may have been average, but it grew to a crescendo like an interesting novel one had doubts about, but became happy he read it to the end. This is a good movie". Sodas and Popcorn on the other hand believed the film would've been better with less songs. It gave a 4 out of 5 rating and wrote "This was a very beautiful script filled with lots of suspense, intrigue, emotion and a little bit of good ol’ action and my least favourite, the singing. The flashbacks were beautiful, the sex scenes were top notch, the fight scenes were actually believable, even better than some Hollywood struggle scenes".

Awards
Hoodrush received two nominations at the 9th Africa Movie Academy Awards including the category Achievement in Soundtrack. It also received eleven nominations at the 2013 Nollywood Movies Awards including the category Best Movie.

Africa Movie Academy Awards
AMAA 2013 Prize For Best Actor In A Supporting Role (won)
AMAA 2013 Prize For Achievement In Soundtrack (nominated)

Nollywood Movies Awards
Best Movie
Best Lead Actor (won)
Best Lead Actress
Best Supporting Actor
Best Supporting Actress
Best Director
Best Editing
Best Sound Design
Best Original Screenplay
Best Soundtrack (won)
Best Rising Star (male)
Best Rising Star (female)

See also
 List of Nigerian films of 2012

References

External links
 
 

2012 films
English-language Nigerian films
Nigerian thriller films
Nigerian musical films
2010s musical films
Films based on musicals
2010s musical drama films
Films shot in Lagos
Films set in Lagos
2010s thriller films
2012 drama films
2010s English-language films
Films shot in Nigeria